Werner Lupberger (born 15 December 1975, in Pretoria) is a South African racing driver. He has competed in such series as the British Formula Three Championship, Italian Formula 3000 and International Formula 3000.

Complete International Formula 3000 results 
(key) (Races in bold indicate pole position; races in italics indicate fastest lap.)

Complete Italian Formula 3000 results 

(key) (Races in bold indicate pole position; races in italics indicate fastest lap)

References

External links
 Career statistics from Driver Database

South African racing drivers
International Formula 3000 drivers
Auto GP drivers
British Formula Three Championship drivers
24 Hours of Le Mans drivers
Living people
1975 births